Wilhelm Thöny (10 February 1888, Graz - 1 May 1949, New York City) was an Austrian painter, illustrator, graphic artist and etcher.

Biography 
He first attended the Landeskunstschule (State Art School) in Graz then, from 1908 to 1912, studied at the Academy of Fine Arts Munich with Angelo Jank and Gabriel von Hackl. During this time, he also learned to sing and play the piano.

In 1915, he volunteered to join the Graz Rifle Regiment #3. In 1916, he was allowed to visit the prisoner-of-war camps in Broumov, Kleinmünchen (near Linz) and Mauthausen, where he made portrait studies of the prisoners; mostly Italian, Albanian, Romanian and Greek. In 1917, he became a Lieutenant in the Reserve and was stationed on the Italian Front, where he created large-scale depictions of the battles fought there. Many were reproduced as postcards; sold to benefit the regiment's Widows and Orphans Fund. Later, he illustrated a history of his regiment; although he was never designated as an official war artist. In this regard, he is often confused with Eduard Thöny (no relation), who was an official artist with the press corps.

In 1925, he married Thea Herrmann-Trautner; daughter of the American expatriate painter, Frank Herrmann (1866–1942), and sister of the caricaturist Eva Herrmann. After a short stay in Paris, in 1929, he produced his first large oil painting, Ile de la Cité. This led to a fascination with large cities so, in 1931, he left Graz and lived in Paris until 1938; precipitating a major change in his style. His summers were spent on the Côte d’Azur, where some of his most significant works were produced. After a visit to Manhattan in 1933, he began to produce paintings with New York motifs. During these years, he exhibited widely, receiving a gold medal at the Exposition Internationale des Arts et Techniques dans la Vie Moderne in 1937. The following year, he and Thea moved to New York City.

On March 4, 1948, a warehouse fire destroyed over a thousand of his graphics and paintings which were being stored for an exhibition. This was the bulk of his life's work. He fell into a depression, from which he never recovered, until his death the following year.

In 1976, a street in the Donaustadt district of Vienna was named after him.

Selected paintings

References

Further reading 
 Neue Galerie Graz: Wilhelm Thöny. Im Sog der Moderne. Exhibition catalogue, 24 May-22 September 2013, Graz, .
 Wieland Schmied: Wilhelm Thöny. Porträt eines Einzelgängers. Verlag Galerie Welz, Salzburg 1976. 
 Otto Breicha: Wilhelm Thöny. Sein Werk im Rupertinum. Verlag Galerie Welz, Salzburg 1997, . 
 Otto Breicha: Wilhelm Thönys Rötelzeichnungen zur "Französischen Revolution" aus dem Besitz der Graphischen Sammlung Albertina, Wien. Verlag Galerie Welz, Salzburg 1988,

External links 

More works by Thöny @ ArtNet

1888 births
1949 deaths
Austrian painters
Military art
Academy of Fine Arts, Munich alumni
Austrian emigrants to France
Austrian emigrants to the United States
Artists from Graz